Radar Secret Service is a 1950 action film starring John Howard, produced by Barney A. Sarecky and directed by Sam Newfield. The film was featured on the American television show Mystery Science Theater 3000.

Plot
In the post-World War Two era, Michael, a big wheel in the organized crime world, and his head man Mickey Moran, come up with a plan to steal a shipment of Uranium-238.  The theft is a success, except one of their henchmen, a character named Blackie, gets caught.  Radar Patrol sends Bill Travis, head of their OX-3 division, to find more information about the stolen radioactive material.  Radar Patrol uses a picture found on Blackie as a clue.  The picture is a waitress, and they correctly deduce that she must be Blackie's girlfriend.  They search every restaurant in town looking for her.  When they finally find her, they recruit her as an informant.

In the meantime OX-Q the Radar Patrol Headquarters uses new radar technology to find a car carrying the radioactive material and tells OX-3 to go after the car, but it didn’t have all of the material, and Mickey Moran manages to escape again.  Radar Patrol decides to use a helicopter to see if they can detect where the rest of the material is hidden while Michael, Mickey, and a woman pretending to be a girlfriend to both of them, all try to come up with another plan.  The finalized plan is to send out a decoy car, while Mickey delivers the bulk of the stuff to a river as Michael instructed.

Mickey then finds out he’s being double crossed by Michael right as Radar Patrol arrives.  So there’s a three way fight between Michael’s guys, Mickey’s guys, and Radar Patrol.  Mickey gets shot, but manages to drive to Michael’s apartment, only to get shot a second time by Michael and killed.  Michael and the woman he's with try to escape, but then Blackie’s girlfriend shows up with a gun, mad that Michael hasn't found a way to get Blackie out of jail yet.  She tries to call the police but Michael abruptly shoots her.  Michael and the woman try to escape yet again, but Radar Patrol shows up and catches them.  As the movie ends, we find out that Radar Patrol can now get some new equipment because their budget has been increased.

Cast
 John Howard as Bill Travis
 Adele Jergens as Lila
 Tom Neal as Mickey Moran
 Myrna Dell as Marge
 Sid Melton as Pill Box
 Ralph Byrd as Static
 Robert Kent as Henchman Benson
 Pierre Watkin as Mr. Hamilton (credited as Pierre Watkins)
 Tristram Coffin as Michael
 Riley Hill as Henchman Blackie
 Robert Carson as Tom, Radar Operator
 Kenne Duncan as Michael's Henchman
 Holly Bane as Truck Radio Operator, OX-2
 Bill Crespinel as Helicopter Operator
 Bill Hammond as Henchman Joe #2
 Jan Kayne as Myrtle the Maid
 John McKee as Second Bruiser
 Marshall Reed as First Bruiser
 Boyd Stockman as Henchman Joe #1
 Bob Woodward as Henchman Gus

Mystery Science Theater 3000 episode
The Mystery Science Theater 3000 presentation of the movie was paired with the railroad crossing safety short film, Last Clear Chance, in episode #520, which first aired on December 18, 1993. The movie was introduced by the Mads as containing "Hypno-Helio Static Stasis (containing X-4)", which amounted to tedious scenes with marginal plot development at best. The program was identified as a continuation of the "Deep Hurting" concept, drawing from the rock-climbing scenes of Lost Continent and the sandstorm scenes of Hercules Against the Moon Men.

During the show's second season, according to writer and performer Frank Conniff, the writers were eager to use Radar Secret Service on MST3K, but they were denied the opportunity. During the show's fifth season, they were offered the rights but chose the movie only because "a piece of junk like Radar Secret Service was, in fact, the cream of the crop of the ... films" they had to choose from.

The episode did not make the Top 100 list of episodes as voted upon by MST3K Season 11 Kickstarter backers. Writer Jim Vorel ranked the episode #119 out of 191 MST3K episodes, saying, "If you like your films and riffs to be dry, cynical and encased in a stuffy governmental shell, then Radar Secret Service is the episode for you."

The MST3K version of Radar Secret Service was included as part of the Mystery Science Theater 3000, Volume XXXII DVD collection, released by Shout! Factory on March 24, 2015. The other episodes in the four-disc set include Space Travelers (episode #401), Hercules (episode #502), and San Francisco International (episode #614).

References

External links
 

1950s action films
1950 films
1950s spy films
Lippert Pictures films
Films directed by Sam Newfield
American action films
American black-and-white films
1950s English-language films
1950s American films